Gary Bennett (born 13 November 1970) is an English former professional footballer. A prolific striker, he holds goalscoring records at two of his former clubs.

Career
Born in Enfield, Bennett was in the youth system at Tottenham Hotspur, but began his senior career at Colchester United, for whom he played in the FA Trophy final in 1992. In 1994, he left Colchester to join Woking, and during the 1990s also played for Dagenham & Redbridge and Braintree Town, for whom he scored a record 57 goals in one season. In the 2000s he had two spells with A.F.C. Sudbury, playing 253 games and scoring 172 goals, and remains the club's all-time top scorer. He also played for Chelmsford City (who paid £3,000 to sign him from Sudbury in 2000), Witham Town, Ipswich Wanderers (where he was player/assistant manager) and Tiptree United. After playing a solitary match for Tiptree, Bennett stopped playing football and currently works as a postman.

Honours

Club
Colchester United
 Football Conference Winner (1): 1991–92
 Football Conference Runner-up (1): 1990–91
 FA Trophy Winner (1): 1991–92

References

1970 births
Living people
Footballers from Enfield, London
English footballers
Association football forwards
Colchester United F.C. players
Braintree Town F.C. players
Brentford F.C. players
Woking F.C. players
Dagenham & Redbridge F.C. players
A.F.C. Sudbury players
Chelmsford City F.C. players
Witham Town F.C. players
Ipswich Wanderers F.C. players
Tiptree United F.C. players
English Football League players
National League (English football) players